UMMG or U.M.M.G. may refer to:

University of Medicine, Magway
University of Miami Medical Group
Upper Manhattan Medical Group, a track in the album Jazz Party
 ICAO code for the Hrodna Airport